Campo Belo (Portuguese for "beautiful field") is a city located in Minas Gerais state, in Brazil. It was founded in 1879.

Geography

Climate 
The Köppen climate classification of the region is Cwa (Tropical on high altitudes, humid/warm summer and a dry/cool winter).

Soil 
Silic - Clay.

Topography 
Plain : 15%
Waivy : 55%
Mountain: 30%

References

Municipalities in Minas Gerais